Mitrella inflata is a species of sea snail in the family Columbellidae, the dove snails.

Description
The length of the shell attains 6.4 mm.

Distribution
This marine species occurs off Senegal.

References

 Pelorce J. & Boyer F. 2005. La famille Columbellidae (Gastropoda; Muricoidea) dans l'infralittoral de la Péninsule du Cap Vert (Sénégal). Iberus 23(2): 95-118
 Bouchet, P.; Fontaine, B. (2009). List of new marine species described between 2002-2006. Census of Marine Life

inflata
Gastropods described in 2005